Lepers Caress is the second EP by metal band Arsis. It was released on December 4, 2012 as a digital release through Scion Audio/Visual. This is the first album to feature Shawn Priest on drums and Brandon Ellis on guitars who joined earlier that year. They replacing Mike Van Dyne and Nick Cordle after their departure.

Track listing

Credits

Personnel
James Malone - vocals, lead & rhythm guitar
Noah Martin - bass, rhythm guitar, backing vocals
Shawn Priest - drums, backing vocals
Brandon Ellis - lead & rhythm guitar, backing vocals

Production
Chris "Zeuss" Harris - mixing, mastering
French	- Artwork, Design

References

2012 albums
Arsis EPs